This is a list of periodicals published by the Seventh-day Adventist Church or by its church members. They include both official and unofficial publications relating to Seventh-day Adventism. Magazines which are only available on the internet are not included.

Most periodicals are listed by location of the publisher. A brief list of the most circulated periodicals is also included.

Periodicals by circulation 
The list of Adventist periodicals by circulation may give some indication of notability, but this criterion alone does not measure the impact of a magazine, and gift subscriptions and other freely distributed magazines might be expected to have an inflated circulation. As an example, one may assume that academic journals have more influence than their lower circulations suggest.

Items here are also listed by location below. Many older issues of these periodicals can be viewed online at the Adventist Archives

 Adventist World – 1,200,000 (unpaid circulation)
 Liberty – over 200,000
 Health & Home(Adventist magazine) (flagship publication of Philippine Publishing House) – 165,000
 El Centinela (Spanish version of Signs of the Times) – 100,000
 Pacific Union Recorder – 75,000 unpaid
 Ministry – 53,000 (including 37,000 gift subscriptions)
 Signs of the Times (Australian version) – 45,000
Gleaner – 40,000 unpaid subscribers
 Adventist Review – 30,000 paid subscribers
 Guide – 30,000
 College and University Dialogue – 30,000
 Record, magazine issued freely to Australian church members – 26,000
 Korean Signs of the Times – 17,000 in 2004

Scholarly journals 

The Journal of Adventist Education.
Journal of the Adventist Theological Society - ? paid; nearly 2000 unpaid
 Spectrum, Adventist focus, independent.
 Andrews University Seminary Studies - 600
 Journal of Asia Adventist Seminary (?)
 Journal of Adventist Mission Studies (?)
 Asia Adventist Seminary Studies (?)
 Valley View University Journal of Theology (?)
 Journal of AIIAS African Theological Association (?)

Sabbath School lessons 
These publications are used during Sabbath School time at church. Many are published on various denominational presses worldwide.

 Sabbath School Lesson study guide, or colloquially "the quarterly" (Adult)
 Beginner (infants)
 Kindergarten (Kindergarten)
 Our Little Friend (Kindergarten)
 Primary (Primary age)
 Primary Treasure (Primary age)
 PowerPoints (Juniors and Earliteens)
 Guide, a weekly story magazine for Juniors and Earliteens (10-14 year olds).
 Real Time Faith (Earliteens)
 Insight (Youth)
 Cornerstone Connections or Collegiate Quarterly (Youth)

Official local area newsmagazines 
The official newsmagazines include:

 The Inter-American Division Messenger 1924–1966 in DjVu format,

United States:
 Gleaner (North Pacific Union) 1906–present (as of 2018)
 Pacific Union Recorder (Pacific Union Conference) 1901–1975 in DjVu format, 2003—
 Visitor (Columbia Union Conference) 1901–1966 in DjVu format, 2004–2006, 2007–2008

Adventist publishing houses

North America 
North America is administered as the North American Division of Seventh-day Adventists.

Review and Herald Publishing Association 
The Review and Herald Publishing Association:
 Adventist Review, the official Seventh-day Adventist magazine, issued weekly and with nearly 30,000 paid subscribers.
 Adventist World, an international magazine with 1.2 million unpaid circulation.
 Ministry, for pastors, by the Ministerial Association of Seventh-day Adventists. Monthly circulation to Adventists about 16,000; and bimonthly sent to about 37,000 pastors of other denominations on a gift basis.  ISSN 0026-5314
 Liberty, devoted to religious freedom
 Listen, drug education for teens
 Message, mission with an urban edge
 Shabbat Shalom, aimed at facilitating dialogue between Jews and Christians
 Vibrant Life, about the health message
 Winner, drug education for late primary school age
 Women of Spirit, for women

Pacific Press Publishing Association 
The Pacific Press Publishing Association:
El Centinela monthly magazine, Spanish language version of Signs
Signs of the Times monthly magazine for North America (one year of archives)

South Pacific 
Signs Publishing Company in Warburton, Victoria, Australia is the church publisher of the South Pacific Division of Seventh-day Adventists. The three major magazines it publishes are:
 Signs of the Times, an easy-reading magazine in a format similar to Reader's Digest, the flagship publication of Signs Publishing Company for distribution in the South Pacific. It has a circulation of 45,000
 Record is a weekly news magazine aimed at churchmembers, issued freely to churches. Circulation of 26,000
 Edge is targeted at young adults, and published bimonthly by Signs Publishing.

Asia 
 Catalyst, published from Mission College in Thailand
 Kerala Adventist Chronicle is the official magazine of southwest India union of SDA

South America 
South America is administered as the South American Division of Seventh-day Adventists.

Asociación Casa Editora Sudamericana 
The Asociación Casa Editora Sudamericana (South American Publishing House):
 Revista Adventista, the Spanish-language version of the Adventist Review.
 Vida Feliz, a publication related to the health message.
 Mis amigos, a publication in magazine format for children.

Universidad Adventista de Chile 
The Universidad Adventista de Chile, through its Faculty of Theology publishes:
 Advenimiento, a theological review published semesterly, as a mean to make known researches in the biblical-theological field, in the context of the seventh-day adventist faith.

Independent 
These may be significantly left or right of the Adventist mainstream, or may just be published by an independent organization.

Historic Adventism 
 Our Firm Foundation, published by Hope International
 Pilgrim's Rest, by Vance Ferrell
 Adventists Affirm, published from Michigan. Archives from Spring 2000 (as of August 2008)

More moderate 
 Perspective Digest, the popular-level publication of the Adventist Theological Society
Adventist Australia

Progressive/liberal Adventism 
 Adventist Today
 Spectrum, published by the Association of Adventist Forums. In 2002, paid subscriptions numbered 3000
 Adventist Heritage
 Present Truth Magazine (formerly of Robert Brinsmead)
 Good News Unlimited
 Adventist Professional
 Adventist Currents
 Evangelica

See also 
 Seventh-day Adventist Church
 List of United States magazines
 Media ministries of the Seventh-day Adventist Church
 History of the Seventh-day Adventist Church

References

External links 
 Adventist Archives
 Seventh-day Adventist Periodical Index (SDAPI), sponsored by the Association of Seventh-day Adventist Librarians  (ASDAL)
 List of Periodicals in the Index
 Publishing Ministries of the General Conference of Seventh-day Adventists, a list of church publishers worldwide.
 Review and Herald magazines
 WorldCat search for Seventh-day Adventist periodicals
 Publishing Ministries, a list of church publishers.
 List of Adventist journals from ASDAL

Analysis and commentary:
 Four SDA News Reports Compared by Alicia Goree in Adventist Today 6:3

 
Seventh-day Adventist periodicals
Periodicals